0 A.D. is a free and open-source real-time strategy video game under development by Wildfire Games. It is a historical war and economy game focusing on the years between 500 BC and 1 BC, with the years between 1 AD and 500 AD planned to be developed in the future. The game is cross-platform, playable on Windows, macOS, Linux, FreeBSD, and OpenBSD. It is composed entirely of free software and free media, using the GNU GPLv2 (or later) license for the game engine source code, and the CC BY-SA license for the game art and music.

Gameplay
0 A.D. features the traditional real-time strategy gameplay components of building a base, developing an economy, training an army, engaging in combat, and researching new technologies. The game includes multiple units and buildings specific to each civilization as well as both land and naval units.

During the game, the player advances from "village phase", to "town phase", to "city phase". The phases represent the sizes of settlements in history, and every phase unlocks new units, buildings, and technologies.

Multiplayer functionality is implemented using peer-to-peer networking, without a central server.

Development
0 A.D. originally began in 2001 as a comprehensive total conversion mod concept for Age of Empires II: The Age of Kings. The development team later decided that making the project as a mod was too limiting to their creative freedom, and elected to move their art and ideas to an in-house engine, making it a standalone game.

The historical accuracy of the game elements has been the highest development priority. Unit and building names are shown in the original language of the civilization they belong to, and they are also translated into the language in which the user is playing the game. There is also a strong focus on attempting to provide a high visual accuracy of unit armor, weapons, and buildings.

On 10 July 2009, Wildfire Games released the source code for 0 A.D. under the GNU GPLv2 (or later) license, and made the artwork available under the CC BY-SA license.

There were around ten to fifteen people working on 0 A.D. around 23 March 2010; but since development started, over 100 people have contributed to the project. On 5 September 2013, an Indiegogo crowdfunding campaign was started with a  goal. The majority of the project's finances are managed by the Software in the Public Interest organisation. There is no official release date set for the finished version of the game.

The composers of the music in the game are Omri Lahav, Jeff Willet, Mike Skalandunas, and Shlomi Nogay. A 26-track soundtrack was released on 8 June 2018.

Reception
In 2012, 0 A.D. received second place in the IndieDB Player's Choice Upcoming Indie Game of the Year competition. 0 A.D. has been generally well received. It was voted as LinuxQuestions.org "Open Source Game of the Year for 2013".  Between 2010 and June 2021, the game was downloaded from SourceForge.net over 1.3 million times.

See also

 Free and open source software
 Linux gaming
 List of free and open-source software packages
 List of open source games
 Year zero

Notes

References

External links

 
 0 A.D. Alpha 25 Trailer

Creative Commons-licensed video games
Crowdfunded video games
Free software that uses SDL
Indie video games
Indiegogo projects
Linux games
MacOS games
Multiplayer and single-player video games
Multiplayer online games
Open-source video games
Strategy video games
Real-time strategy video games
Software that uses wxWidgets
Upcoming video games
Video games set in ancient Rome
Video games set in antiquity
Video games set in Egypt
Video games set in Greece
Video games set in India
Video games set in Iran
Windows games